Susanna Mkrtchyan (Armenian:Սուսաննա Մկրտչյան) (born August 26, 1949) is an Armenian Wikimedian and a professor of database and system research. She founded and leads the Wikimedia Armenia chapter, which organizes outreach and workshops to improve the Armenian Wikipedia, including an annual conference.

In 2015, she received an Honourable mention in the context of the annual award Wikimedian of the Year attributed by Jimmy Wales.

Life and work 
Mkrtchyan was born in Yerevan.  She studied at Avetik Isahakyan School in Yerevan, and later attended the Manuk Abeghyan school with a focus on physics, graduating with honors. In 1966-1971 she studied computing at the mathematics faculty of Yerevan State University. In 1984 she joined the System Research Institute of the Russian Academy of Sciences, helping to develop the "INES" database management system.

Since 2010, she has worked as a senior researcher at the Institute of Informatics and Automation Problems.

References 

1949 births
Living people
20th-century Armenian people
21st-century Armenian people
20th-century Armenian women
21st-century Armenian women
Yerevan State University alumni
Wikimedians